McCords Crossroads (formerly, Hopewell) is an unincorporated community in Cherokee County, Alabama, United States. It lies at an elevation of 640 feet (195 m).

History
McCord Crossroads was named in honor of James McCord.

References

Geography of Cherokee County, Alabama
Unincorporated communities in Alabama